Yevgeny Vladimirovich Yablonsky or Yauhen Uladzimiravich Yablonski (born 10 May 1995) is a Belarusian professional footballer who plays for Aris Limassol.

Honours
BATE Borisov
Belarusian Premier League: 2014, 2015, 2016, 2017, 2018
Belarusian Cup: 2014–15, 2019–20, 2020–21
Belarusian Super Cup: 2015, 2016, 2017

International goals
Scores and results list Belarus' goal tally first.

References

External links
 
 
 Profile at BATE website

1995 births
Living people
People from Chervyen
Sportspeople from Minsk Region
Belarusian footballers
Association football midfielders
Belarus international footballers
Belarusian expatriate footballers
Expatriate footballers in Cyprus
FC BATE Borisov players
Aris Limassol FC players